Renata Kunkel (born 1954) is a Polish composer. She was born in Gdańsk, and studied composition with Marian Borkowski and conducting with Ryszard Dudek and Elisabeth Kuyper at the Academy of Music in Warsaw.

Works
Selected works include:
Second String Quartet
Symphony For Orchestra

Her music has been recorded and issued on media, including:
Warszawska Jesień - 1988 - Warsaw Autumn Kronika Dźwiękowa - 1988, Vinyl, Polskie Nagrania Muza

References

1954 births
Living people
20th-century classical composers
Women classical composers
Polish composers
20th-century women composers
Polish women composers